Jamie Van Natta (born March 31, 1978) is an American compound archer. She is the current World Archery number four in women's compound archery. The highest ranking she has reached is the first position, which she reached for the last time in May 2009.

Van Natta is a resident of Toledo, Ohio and have degrees in computer science engineering with a minor in philosophy from the University of Toledo. During the World Cup in Antalya, Turkey she went scuba diving and prior to winning two gold medals at the World Archery Championships in Berlin, Germany she took a tour of the city. When she was in Varese, Italy with Petra Ericsson, she had an honor to meet a parachutist who almost landed on them while they were finishing the match. She also participated in the Archery World Cup, the final round of which was in Dubai.

On November 28, 2008, Jamie Van Natta married Lausanne.

Palmares

1997
 World Outdoor Championships, women's team, Victoria
 World Outdoor Championships, individual, Victoria
2005
 World Games, individual, Duisburg
 World Indoor Championships, women's team, Aalborg
 World Indoor Championships, individual, Aalborg
 World Outdoor Championships, women's team, Madrid
9th, World Outdoor Championships, individual, Madrid
2006
 World Cup, individual, Poreč
 World Cup, women's team, Poreč
 World Cup, individual, San Salvador
 World Cup, women's team, San Salvador
 World Cup, women's team, Shanghai
 World Field Championships, individual, Gothenburg
2007
 World Indoor Championships, women's team, Izmir
19th, World Indoor Championships, individual, Izmir
 World Cup, women's team, Ulsan
 Arizona Cup, individual, Phoenix, Arizona
 World Cup, individual, Varese
 World Cup, women's team, Varese
 World Cup, women's team, Antalya
 World Outdoor Championships, women's team, Leipzig
13th, World Outdoor Championships, individual, Leipzig
 World Cup, individual, Dover
 World Cup, individual, Dubai
2008
 World Cup, individual, Santo Domingo
 Arizona Cup, individual, Phoenix, Arizona
 World Cup, individual, Antalya
 World Cup, individual, Boé
 World Cup Final, individual, Lausanne
2009
 World Cup, women's team, Santo Domingo
 World Cup, individual, Santo Domingo
 Arizona Cup, individual, Phoenix, Arizona
2010
 Arizona Cup, individual, Phoenix, Arizona
 Arizona Cup, women's team, Phoenix, Arizona
 Arizona Cup, mixed team, Phoenix, Arizona
 World Cup, women's team, Poreč
 World Cup, mixed team, Poreč
 World Cup, women's team, Ogden
 World Cup, mixed team, Ogden
 World Cup, individual, Ogden
 World Cup, women's team, Shanghai
7th, World Cup Final, individual, Edinburgh
2011
 Arizona Cup, women's team, Phoenix, Arizona
 Arizona Cup, individual, Phoenix, Arizona
 Arizona Cup, individual, Phoenix, Arizona
 World Cup, women's team, Antalya
 World Outdoor Championships, women's team, Turin
9th, World Outdoor Championships, individual, Turin
9th, World Outdoor Championships, mixed team, Turin
 World Cup, women's team, Ogden
 World Cup, individual, Shanghai
 World Cup, women's team, Shanghai
 World Cup, mixed team, Shanghai
2012
 Arizona Cup, individual, Phoenix, Arizona
 Arizona Cup, women's team, Phoenix, Arizona
 Arizona Cup, mixed team, Phoenix, Arizona
 World Cup, women's team, Shanghai
 World Cup, mixed team, Shanghai
 World Cup, women's team, Antalya

References

External links

1978 births
Living people
American female archers
Sportspeople from Toledo, Ohio
University of Toledo alumni
21st-century American women